The Queensland Performing Arts Centre (also known as QPAC) is part of the Queensland Cultural Centre and is located on the corner of Melbourne Street and Grey Street in Brisbane's South Bank precinct. Opened in 1985, it includes the Lyric Theatre, Concert Hall, Playhouse and Cremorne Theatre.

History

QPAC was designed by local architect Robin Gibson in the mid-1970s, after State Cabinet formally recognised in 1972 the need for a new Queensland Art Gallery and a new major performing arts centre, in addition to a new location for the Queensland Museum and State Library. It was opened by the Duke of Kent in 1985.

Although originally opened as the “Queensland Performing Arts Complex”, after years of resisting the popular mis-naming of the building, it was officially changed to the “Queensland Performing Arts Centre” and all signage was altered to match.

Opening with only 3 stages, the Lyric Theatre, the Concert Hall and the Cremorne Theatre, the Centre was designed with expansion in mind. In 1998 the Playhouse was opened, ending the original extension plans. A fifth and likely final Theatre (seating 1500-1700) was announced in late May 2018 with a budget of $125 million. Completion is aimed for 2022. Currently tenders are being sought for its design.

In 2017, QPAC hosted more than 1.3 million visitors to more than 1,200 performances, given the city population of Brisbane at 2.4 million, with the South East Queensland area's population sitting at 3.5 million and the entire State of Queensland at 5 million.

Programming
Each year QPAC hosts over 1,200 performances across its four theatres and outdoor spaces. The centre's versatile venues accommodate a wide variety of performance including dance, musicals, theatre, opera, comedy and contemporary and classical music concerts featuring leading Queensland, Australian and international actors, dancers, musicians, artists and companies. In addition, QPAC co-produces and invests in some of Australia's most innovative and successful shows and free outdoor programs.

In recent years, QPAC has presented some of the world's leading artists and companies in the QPAC International Series including Paris Opera Ballet in 2020, Bolshoi Ballet in 2019, La Scala Theatre Ballet in 2018, The Royal Ballet in 2017, Bolshoi Ballet in 2013, Hamburg Ballet, Hamburg State Opera and Hamburg Philharmonic in 2012 and American Ballet Theatre in 2014.

QPAC produces the Out of the Box Festival for children 8 years and under, and Clancestry program, as part of the QPAC First Nations Program  which recognises the significant role First Nations Peoples have contributed and continue to contribute to Queensland’s historical, creative and cultural landscapes.

QPAC is the performance home for Queensland's leading performing arts companies – Queensland Ballet, Queensland Theatre Company, Opera Queensland, Queensland Youth Orchestras and Queensland Symphony Orchestra. In addition, QPAC regularly hosts many of Australia's leading performing arts companies including The Australian Ballet, Sydney Dance Company, Australian Chamber Orchestra and Bangarra Dance Theatre.

Performance spaces

The Lyric Theatre is a proscenium theatre and is the largest venue in QPAC, with a seating capacity of approximately 2,000. It is Brisbane's main venue for musicals, operas and ballets.
The Concert Hall is the second largest venue in QPAC, with a seating capacity of approximately 1,600 (1,800 if the choir balcony seats are used). It is Brisbane's main venue for orchestral performances although it is also used for comedy performances, graduation ceremonies, awards presentations and even rock concerts. The venue features a 6,566 pipe Klaisorgan which was built in 1986. Due to the overwhelming demand placed on the entire venue for traditional theatrical performances, in 2014 a creative solution was achieved by the addition of a removable proscenium arch and stage mechanisms for the Concert Hall increasing the type of performances possible in this Theatre.
The Playhouse is a proscenium theatre and is the third largest venue in QPAC, with a seating capacity of approximately 850. The venue was constructed in 1997 and its premiere production was The Marriage of Figaro, with Geoffrey Rush in the title role of Figaro, in September 1998.
The Cremorne Theatre is the fourth largest venue in QPAC with a maximum seating capacity of 277. It is a reconfigurable performance space with six configurations (proscenium, theatre in the round, concert, cabaret, cinema or flat floor). Its name has been taken from an earlier venue in the vicinity, the Cremorne Theatre. Located at the entrance to the Cremorne Theatre is the Tony Gould Gallery; it features changing exhibits related to the performing arts, including theatre, opera, ballet, dance, costumes and scenery. The exhibits are organised by the QPAC Museum.

In May 2018, the Queensland Government and QPAC announced funding had been secured for The New Performing Arts Venue to be located on the Playhouse Green, adjacent to the current complex. The new theatre is projected to be completed by late 2022, and will seat a minimum of 1,500 patrons.

Associated organisations
Groups with programs at QPAC include:
Opera Queensland
Queensland Symphony Orchestra
Queensland Ballet
Queensland Theatre Company
Queensland Youth Symphony Orchestra
Queensland Pops Orchestra
The Australian Ballet
Australian Chamber Orchestra
Australian Brandenburg Orchestra
Oscar Theatre Company
Northern Rivers Symphony Orchestra
The QPAC Choir

References

External links

QPAC official website
QPAC panorama photos
QPAC photos and sound
QPAC information
QPAC Museum 
Lyric Theatre at QPAC – performances at the theatre (incomplete listing)
 Cremorne Theatre at QPAC – performances at the theatre (incomplete listing)
 Playhouse at QPAC – performances at the theatre (incomplete listing)
 Cultural Centre Busway Station map – includes showing position of QPAC

Tourist attractions in Brisbane
Theatres in Brisbane
Culture of Brisbane
Theatres completed in 1985
Brutalist architecture in Australia
Performing arts centres in Australia
Concert halls in Australia
Philip Cox buildings
Queensland Cultural Centre
1985 establishments in Australia
South Brisbane, Queensland